Nishada xantholoma is a moth of the family Erebidae first described by Snellen in 1879. It is found on Sulawesi in Indonesia.

References

Lithosiina
Moths described in 1879